Ian Ramage (born 5 November 1958) is a cricket umpire from Scotland. He stood in his first One Day International (ODI) match on 24 August 2008, between Ireland and Kenya in Belfast. He stood in his first Twenty20 International (T20I) match on 24 July 2012, between Bangladesh and Scotland in The Hague.

In January 2018, he was named as one of the seventeen on-field umpires for the 2018 Under-19 Cricket World Cup. In March 2019, Ramage announced his retirement from international duties, but would continue to work with the England and Wales Cricket Board (ECB).

See also
 List of One Day International cricket umpires
 List of Twenty20 International cricket umpires

References

1958 births
Living people
Scottish One Day International cricket umpires
Scottish Twenty20 International cricket umpires
Sportspeople from Edinburgh
Scottish cricket umpires